Armed Forces Day (formerly Veterans' Day) in the United Kingdom is an annual event celebrated in late June to commemorate the service of men and women in the British Armed Forces. Veterans' Day was first observed in 2006. Although an official event, it is not a public holiday in the UK. The name was changed to Armed Forces Day in 2009. Armed Forces Day has so far been observed on the last Saturday of June.

Origins
Plans for a Veterans' Day were announced in February 2006 by then-Chancellor of the Exchequer, Gordon Brown, who said the aim was to ensure the contribution of veterans was never forgotten. The day is marked across the UK by local ceremonies and the presentation of medals to living ex-servicemen and women. The date of 27 June was chosen as it came the day after the anniversary of the first investiture of the Victoria Cross, in Hyde Park, London in 1857.

Veterans' Day was created as a permanent extension of Veterans' Awareness Week first held in 2005. Armed Forces Day generally focuses on celebrating living current/ex servicemen & women, whereas Remembrance Day focuses on honouring the dead. Although it used to be called Veterans' Day in the UK, it is not the same as the United States' Veterans Day which is more similar to Remembrance Day in the Commonwealth.

On 25 June 2007 Jim Devine, the Member of Parliament for Livingston, tabled a House of Commons Early Day Motion calling for the day to be a public holiday, stating "that this House recognises the outstanding contribution that veterans have made to the country; and believes that Veterans' Day should be a national public holiday across the United Kingdom."

Veterans' Day

2006
The first Veterans' Day in 2006 saw a series of events across the UK which included an event at the Imperial War Museum in London, which was attended by Lachhiman Gurung VC, a Nepalese recipient of the Victoria Cross, which was awarded for bravery in 1945 when he was a Rifleman in the 4th Battalion of The 8th Gurkha Rifles, British Indian Army during World War II in Burma (Myanmar), and Corporal Christopher Finney GC of the Blues and Royals who was awarded the George Cross for bravery under friendly fire during the 2003 invasion of Iraq. Parades were held in Dundee and Staffordshire as well as a service at Westminster Abbey. There was also an evening reception at 10 Downing Street for representatives of veterans associations.

2007
The 2007 national event was held in Birmingham as the start of a five-day event from 27 June to 1 July. In the morning there was a "Parade of Standards" which was led by The Central Band of the Royal Air Force, from the International Convention Centre (ICC) to the Hall of Memory in Centenary Square.
The day also included celebrations in Victoria Square where a Spitfire aircraft was on display and the Minister for Veterans Derek Twigg presented five Veterans' Badges and met the families of service personnel who died in the line of duty.

2008
For the 2008 Veterans' Day, the national event was hosted in Blackpool as part of the resort's annual "National Veterans' Week" which ran from 21 to 29 June 2008.

Events were held throughout the UK and the day was promoted by a nationwide television advert. The National Veterans' Day Service was held at Blackpool Cenotaph, a Grade II Listed building which had just been restored, by North Pier on central promenade. The service was led by the Bishop of Blackburn and was attended by Camilla, Duchess of Cornwall, Derek Twigg and General Sir Richard Dannatt, the Chief of the General Staff, as well as Henry Allingham (at the time, he was the oldest surviving veteran of World War I). The service was followed by a "Schools Veterans' Day Thank You" performed by local school children.

Various other events were held throughout Blackpool during the day including a "Badge Presentation ceremony" in the Tower Ballroom with the Duchess of Cornwall presenting veteran badges to among others, Martin Bell. There was also a Veterans' Parade along the promenade and a Falklands War veteran abseiled down Blackpool Tower.

The weekly BBC Radio 2 programme Friday Night is Music Night was broadcast live from the Opera House presented by Ken Bruce with the BBC Concert Orchestra, Alfie Boe and Rebecca Thornhill. The Red Devils parachute display team performed an illuminated "night time parachute drop" outside North Pier and the day ended with a Firework Finale from the pier.

Other events included a commemoration at Trafalgar Square in London.

Armed Forces Day

2009

In 2009 the name of the event was changed to Armed Forces Day, to raise awareness and appreciation for those on active duty. It took place on Saturday 27 June. The host town was Chatham, Kent with events elsewhere, including London.

2010
Armed Forces Day 2010 was held on Saturday 26 June, hosted in the Welsh capital of Cardiff.

The day-long celebrations included a military parade from Cardiff Castle to Cardiff Bay and the city's waterfront, where a range of events, activities and artistic performances were staged on land, sea and air. The parade was led by the Prince of Wales and the Duchess of Cornwall. Royal Navy frigate HMS Kent was docked in Cardiff to take part in the events. An estimated 50,000 people attended the celebrations in the city.

Among the cities joining Cardiff in hosting events were Glasgow, Edinburgh, Aberdeen, Plymouth, Nottingham, Bristol and Manchester.

Events in Cardiff included:
A traditional Drumhead Service in Roald Dahl Plass
Fly-overs by the Battle of Britain Memorial Flight, the Red Arrows and Helicopter Formation
Arena displays in Roald Dahl Plass including the Royal Marine Commando Display Team, and the Royal Marine Band
Military displays representing all of the armed forces throughout Cardiff Bay
Search and rescue Sea King rescue display on the water
The opportunity to go aboard HMS Kent docked in Roath Basin for the weekend
An evening of stage performances featuring The Soldiers and Welsh male voice choir Only Men Aloud!
A firework finale over the waters of Cardiff Bay

2011
Armed Forces Day 2011 took place on Saturday 25 June, with the main parade held on the Royal Mile in the Scottish capital of Edinburgh, which was that year's host city. The personnel of the Royal Navy, British Army and Royal Air Force took the salute from Prince Charles, at the Scottish Parliament, in the presence of dignitaries, including the Prime Minister, the Foreign Secretary, the Defence Secretary, the First Minister of Scotland, and the Chief of the Defence Staff. Over Edinburgh there was a fly-past by the Battle of Britain Memorial Flight and the Red Arrows. HMS Portland, a Royal Navy frigate, was moored at Leith, Edinburgh's port, for public tours.

In Windsor, Berkshire, at the Victoria Barracks, the Irish Guards were awarded their Afghan operational medals by Prince William – who is their ceremonial Colonel of the Regiment – and Catherine, Duchess of Cambridge.

Further events and parades were held across the United Kingdom. At the Royal Navy's base in Portsmouth, a number of public events took place over the weekend, and Royal Navy destroyers HMS Gloucester and HMS Daring were docked and available to the public.

2012

UK Armed Forces Day 2012 was centred on Plymouth and took place on Saturday 30 June.  Similar events were held throughout the United Kingdom.

2013

UK Armed Forces Day 2013 was centred on Nottingham and took place on Saturday 29 June. Over 300 similar events were held throughout the United Kingdom.

2014

UK Armed Forces Day 2014 was centred on Stirling and took place on Saturday 28 June. Hundreds of similar events were held throughout the United Kingdom.

2015

UK Armed Forces Day 2015 was centred on Guildford on Saturday 27 June. Hundreds of similar local events were held throughout the United Kingdom.

2016

UK Armed Forces Day 2016 was centred on the Lincolnshire resort of Cleethorpes on Saturday 25 June, with some activities on 26 June hosted in Grimsby Docks.

2017 

Held at Liverpool

2018 
Llandudno was the host city for UK Armed Forces Day 2018, which was celebrated on Saturday 2 June.

2019 
Salisbury was the host city for UK Armed Forces Day 2019, which was celebrated on Saturday 28 June.

2020 
Scarborough was to be the host location for the 2020 UK Armed Forces Day event on Saturday 27 June. Scarborough was chosen to host the national event in June 2018 after submitting a bid which was described by the MoD as “outstanding”.

The event was due to take place on 27 June 2020, but has been postponed until 2022 due to the COVID-19 pandemic.

2021 

Not held due to COVID-19 Pandemic.

2022 

Planned for 25 June, with the host town being Scarborough, which was to be host in the cancelled 2020 day.

Protests

Armed Forces Day is regularly challenged by pacifist and anti-war groups. The Peace Pledge Union described the introduction of Armed Forces Day in 2009 as an example of "everyday militarism" through which military attitudes and organisations become more involved in civilian life. There have been protests and vigils against Armed Forces Day in various towns and cities. In 2018, the Peace Pledge Union claimed there were protests in more places than at any time since Armed Forces Day was introduced in the UK in 2009. There has been particular criticism of the involvement of children in Armed Forces Day events, with some objecting to situations in which small children are invited to handle real weapons.

In Northern Ireland, there is much support for Armed Forces Day from the unionist community. However, each year the flying of Armed Forces Day flags from council buildings has met with opposition, due to some of the actions of the British Army during The Troubles. The opposition has come from Irish nationalist/republican groups, and from the families of those who were victims of the British Army. Sinn Féin argued that it dishonours the "hundreds of Irish citizens" killed by the British Army during the conflict and is an insult to their families. Republican group Éirígí, who hold a yearly protest in Belfast, have called the event a "propaganda stunt" motivated by "rising recruitment rates" and "growing disgust at the British military's contemporary wars of conquest". Before 2012, the Ministry of Defence had asked Belfast City Council to fly the flag from Belfast City Hall for one day. Since 2012, it has asked that the flag be flown for six days.

References

External links
Armed Forces Day website
 Armed Forces Day Facebook page
Veterans' UK website
2008 Veterans' Week website
Veterans' Day Wales website
Andover Armed Forces Day website

2006 establishments in the United Kingdom
Annual events in the United Kingdom
Armed Forces days
Holidays and observances by scheduling (nth weekday of the month)
June observances
Military life
Military of the United Kingdom
Observances in the United Kingdom
Public holidays in the United Kingdom
Recurring events established in 2006
Veterans' affairs in the United Kingdom
Veterans days